Charles Boyle, Viscount Dungarvan (27 January 1729 – 16 September 1759) was an Anglo-Irish politician. 

Boyle was the eldest son of John Boyle, 5th Earl of Cork and his first wife, Henrietta, daughter of George Hamilton, 1st Earl of Orkney.

He was the Member of Parliament for Cork County in the Irish House of Commons between 1756 and his death in 1759. 

In 1753 he married Susanna Hoare, the daughter of Henry Hoare. They had one child, Henrietta Boyle. As Boyle predeceased his father, the earldom was inherited by Boyle's younger brother, Hamilton Boyle.

References

1729 births
1759 deaths
18th-century Anglo-Irish people
Charles
British courtesy viscounts
Irish MPs 1727–1760
Members of the Parliament of Ireland (pre-1801) for County Cork constituencies